The 2014 J3 League (referred to as the 2014 Meiji Yasuda J3 League (2014 明治安田生命J3リーグ) for sponsorship reasons) was the 18th season of the third tier of the Japanese football, and the inaugural season of the professional J3 League. The season commenced on 9 March and will finish on November 23, with a 3-week break after the 17th week matches on 21 and 22 June (except one on 25 June), then will resume from 19 and 20 July, due to prefectural qualifiers, followed by the 1st and 2nd round matches of the 2014 Emperor's Cup scheduled during the intermission.

Establishment
After the discussion on J1-J2 Joint Committee on 16 January 2013, all J. League clubs agreed in principle with an establishment of the new league starting 2014. This decision was formally put into force by J. League Council on 26 February executive meeting. The league was planned to launch with 10 teams, but another session of J. League Council in July decided that inaugural season of J3 will feature 12 teams.

Clubs

In order to participate, a club must have held an associate membership, or had submitted an application before 30 June 2013, and then passed an inspection in order to obtain a participation licence issued by J. League Council. On November 19, J. League has confirmed the following clubs to participate in the inaugural J3 season:

On 29 September the J. League licensing board issued J2 licenses to the following clubs: Machida Zelvia, Nagano Parceiro, Zweigen Kanazawa, and Gainare Tottori. Tottori's license was issued provisionally, under conditions of financial improvement before 30 October when the league re-assessed the club's financial stance and confirmed the passage of the licensing.

Competition rules
The league will be played in three rounds, each team playing a total of 33 matches. J.League U-22 Selection will play all their matches on the road.

Each team must feature at least 3 players holding professional contracts. Two foreign players are allowed per team, plus 1 more from the ASEAN partner country of J. League. The matchday roster will consist of 16 players, and up to 5 substitutes will be allowed in a game.

Promotion and relegation 
Rules for promotion to J2 will be largely similar to those of Japan Football League in the recent seasons: in order to be promoted, a club must hold a J2 license and finish in top 2 of the league. The U-22 team is not eligible for promotion regardless of their final position. The champions will be promoted directly, in exchange to 22nd-placed J2 club; and the runners-up will participate in the playoffs with 21st J2 club. If either or both top 2 finishers are ineligible for promotion, the playoffs and/or direct exchange will not be held in accordance to the exact positions of promotion-eligible clubs.

No relegation to JFL is planned. Up to 2 clubs may be promoted if they are licensed by J. League for J3 participation and finish in top-4 of JFL.

Foreign players

Note:
A special team, composed of best J1 and J2 youngsters in order to prepare them to 2016 Olympics

League table

Results

Rounds 1–11

Rounds 12–22

Rounds 23–33

J2 promotion playoffs
2014 J2/J3 Play-Offs (2014 J2・J3入れ替え戦)
J3 runners-up Nagano Parceiro played the 21st-placed J2 club Kamatamare Sanuki in a two-legged playoffs. The winning club will play in J2 in 2015 season.

Nagano Parceiro remains in J3 League.Kamatamare Sanuki remains in J2 League.

Top scorers

Updated per games played on 23 November 2014
Source: J. League data

Attendance

References

J3 League seasons
3